Spanish supercentenarians are citizens, residents or emigrants from Spain who have attained or surpassed 110 years of age. , the Gerontology Research Group (GRG) had validated the longevity claims of 45 Spanish supercentenarians, including 42 residents and 3 emigrants. More supercentenarians were identified by other studies and by news reports. The oldest Spanish person ever was Ana María Vela Rubio who died on 15 December 2017, aged 116 years and 47 days. The oldest known living person in Spain is Maria Branyas aged , who emigrated from the United States in 1915. She also is the oldest living person in the world as of 2023.

100 oldest known Spaniards

Biographies

Galo Leoz 
Galo Leoz (22 April 1879 – 23 January 1990) was a Spanish professor of ophtalmology at the Complutense University of Madrid. He performed pioneering studies on the degeneration and regeneration of optical nerves, and on cornea transplants. He received the Spanish  and was president of the Spanish Ophtalmological Society. He was considered the world's oldest doctor, as he kept working until the age of 103. Leoz was Spain's oldest known living person when he died aged 110 years 276 days. His record was surpassed in 1992 by Josep Armengol Jover (23 July 1881 – 20 January 1994), who lived 112 years and 181 days.

Ana María Vela Rubio 
Ana María Vela Rubio (29 October 1901 – 15 December 2017) was born in Puente Genil, Andalucia. She worked as a dressmaker in her youth. She never married her partner as her parents objected to him, but the two had several children. Her daughter, also named Ana, lived with her. Rubio became the oldest verified Spaniard ever on 6 June 2016, when she surpassed the age of María Antonia Castro who had died in 1996, aged 114 years, 220 days. She went on to live to 116 years and 47 days. At the time of her death she was the third-oldest living person in the world, behind Nabi Tajima and Chiyo Miyako. She became the oldest living European upon the death of Emma Morano on 15 April 2017.

Francisco Núñez Olivera 
Francisco Núñez Olivera (13 December 1904 – 29 January 2018) was born and lived his whole life in the village of Bienvenida in the Badajoz province of Extremadura. He joined the army at the age of 19 to fight in the Rif War. He was also a veteran of the Spanish Civil War. He was nicknamed "Marchena" after his resemblance to flamenco singer-songwriter/actor Pepe Marchena. His wife died in 1988, and he survived his two sons. In his later years as a pensioner, he lived with his elder daughter María Antonia. Olivera had his kidney removed when he was 90 and a cataract operation aged 98; he was otherwise in good health. He became the oldest living man after the death of Yisrael Kristal on August 11, 2017. Olivera lived to 113 years and 47 days. At the time of his death, he was the last surviving Spanish veteran of the Rif War and the oldest veteran of the Spanish Army.

Saturnino de la Fuente García 
 (11 February 1909 – 18 January 2022) was born in León. At the age of nine he caught the Spanish flu but survived. A passionate football fan, he co-founded his neighborhood's local team in 1927. He married Antonina Barrio Gutiérrez in 1933 and they had eight children, one of whom died as a child. In 1936 he was not drafted in the Civil War because of his height (1.50 m). A skilled craftsman, he would go on to establish a shoemaking business, eventually being commissioned to make boots for the army.

He became the oldest man alive on 12 August 2021. He had 7 daughters, 14 grandchildren and 22 great-grandchildren. Upon his death in January 2022 at the age of 112 years and 341 days, Venezuelan supercentenarian Juan Vicente Pérez became the world's oldest man.

Notes

References 

Spanish
Supercentenarians